Events from the year 1998 in Portuguese Macau.

Incumbents
 Governor - Vasco Joaquim Rocha Vieira

Events

April
 18 April - The inauguration of the Museum of Macau in Santo António.

References 

 
Years of the 20th century in Macau
Macau
Macau
1990s in Macau